Softball at the 2014 Asian Games was held at Songdo LNG Baseball Stadium, Incheon, South Korea from 27 September to 2 October 2014.

Schedule

Medalists

Squads

Results
All times are Korea Standard Time (UTC+09:00)

Preliminary round

Final round

Semifinals

Final

Grand final

Final standing

References

External links
Official website

 
2014 Asian Games events
2014
Asian Games
2014 Asian Games